Juha Pentikäinen (born 1940) is a Finnish professor in the Department of Comparative Religion at the University of Helsinki. With a field-work oriented approach to the study of religious traditions he is especially interested in the oral history of languages, religions and cultures.

Research
He has research interests in religious traditions in the Finnish culture, and their psychological effects on humans.  Along with many guest professorships, he has appeared to speak at over 100 Universities in numerous different countries.  Based upon his work, other professors (i.e. Veikko Anttonen and Nils G. Holm) in his field have analyzed his approach towards the studies of religion.

Recognition and publications
He is recipient of many awards and honors including the 3rd honorary medal of the international society for research for the lifetime career as the scholar of shamanism in 1999. His publications since 1960 include 30 books, 250 scholarly articles, and 15 films. In 1995 he was nominated to membership of the Finnish Academy of Science and Letters.
He is most known for his book Kalevala Mythology, which is an in depth analysis of Elias Lönnrot's epic Kalevala.  He analyzes both the career background and life of Lönnrot.  Then he analyzes the epic, and the differences between the two versions that Lonnrot wrote.  He reveals the flaws within the epic and presents the argument that the epic instilled a spirit of national romanticism within the Finnish society, which makes it so significant to the Finnish culture.

Personal life
His uncle was Vilho Pentikäinen, well known communist secret spy who spied against Finland for the Soviet Union.

Publications 
 Oral Repertoire and World View. An Anthropological Study of Marina Takalo’s Life History (1978; 2nd printing 1987).
Kalevala Mythology (1989). 
Shamanism and Culture (1997).
Shamanhood: Symbolism and Epic (Budapest: 2000).
Shamanhood – The Endangered Language of the Secret Knowing (Oslo: 2003)
Uralic Mythology and Folklore (1989).
Northern Religions and Shamanism (1992).
Saamelaiset, Pohjoisen kansan mytologia (1995).
Golden King of the Forest: Lore of the Northern Bear (Helsinki: 2007).

References 
1. "Juha Pentikainen." University of Kent. <https://archive.today/20070613140711/http://www.kent.ac.uk/secl/Div_conf/pentikainen.htm>.

1940 births
Living people
Finnish scientists
Academic staff of the University of Helsinki
Neoshamanism